Boulazac Isle Manoire (Limousin: Bolasac Eila Manoire) is a commune in the Dordogne department of southwestern France. The municipality was established on 1 January 2016 and consists of the former communes of Boulazac, Atur and Saint-Laurent-sur-Manoire. On 1 January 2017, the former commune of Sainte-Marie-de-Chignac was merged into Boulazac Isle Manoire. Niversac station, in Saint-Laurent-sur-Manoire, has rail connections to Bordeaux, Périgueux, Brive-la-Gaillarde and Agen.

Population

See also 
Communes of the Dordogne department

References 

Communes of Dordogne